The men's single sculls competition at the 1972 Summer Olympics in Munich took place from 27 August to 2 September at the Olympic Reggatta Course in Oberschleißheim. There were 18 competitors from 18 nations, with each nation limited to a single boat in the event. The event was won by Yury Malyshev of the Soviet Union, the nation's fifth victory in the event; the Soviets returned to the top of the podium after having their four-Games (1952–1964) winning streak broken in 1968. Alberto Demiddi of Argentina took silver, the seventh man to win multiple medals in the single sculls (adding to his 1968 bronze). Wolfgang Güldenpfennig earned bronze, the first medal for East Germany as a separate team (East German rower Achim Hill had won two gold medals for the United Team of Germany in 1960 and 1964).

Background

This was the 16th appearance of the event. Rowing had been on the programme in 1896 but was cancelled due to bad weather. The single sculls has been held every time that rowing has been contested, beginning in 1900.

Two of the 17 single scullers from the 1968 Games returned: bronze medalist (and 1964 fourth-place finisher) Alberto Demiddi of Argentina and sixth-place finisher Kenny Dwan of Great Britain. Demiddi was favored in Munich; along with his prior Olympic experience, he was the reigning (1970) World Champion, a two-time (1967 and 1971) Pan American champion, and the 1971 Diamond Challenge Sculls winner. 

Bermuda, Bulgaria, Ireland, and Portugal each made their debut in the event. Great Britain made its 14th appearance, most among nations, after missing only its second edition of the event in 1964.

Competition format

This rowing event was a single scull event, meaning that each boat was propelled by a single rower. The "scull" portion means that the rower used two oars, one on each side of the boat. The course used the 2000 metres distance that became the Olympic standard in 1912. 

The tournament used the four-round format (three main rounds and a repechage) that had been used in 1968. The competition continued to use the six-boat heat standardised in 1960 as well as the "B" final for ranking 7th through 12th place introduced in 1964.

 Quarterfinals: Three heats of 6 boats each. The top boat in each heat (3 total) advanced directly to the semifinals. The remaining boats (15 total) went to the repechage.
 Repechage: Three heats of 5 each. The top three boats of each heat (9 total) rejoined the quarterfinal winners in the semifinals. The other boats (6 total) were eliminated.
 Semifinals: Two heats of 6 boats each. The top three boats in each heat (6 total) advanced to Final A, the remaining boats (6 total) went to Final B.
 Final: Two finals. Final A consisted of the top 6 boats. Final B placed boats 7 through 12.

Schedule

All times are Central European Time (UTC+1)

Results

Quarterfinals

The winner of each of the three heats qualified for the semifinal round, while the remainder went to the repechage.

Quarterfinal 1

Quarterfinal 2

Quarterfinal 3

Repechage

The top three finishers in each heat qualified for the semifinal round.

Repechage heat 1

Repechage heat 2

Repechage heat 3

Semifinals

The first three in each semifinal heat qualified for Final A, with the remainder going to Final B.

Semifinal 1

Semifinal 2

Finals

Final B

Final A

Results summary

References

External links
 Official reports of the 1972 Summer Olympics

Men's single sculls